Viljar Loor (1 October 1953 – 22 March 2011) was the most successful Estonian volleyball player. In the 1980 Summer Olympics he was part of the gold winning Soviet Union volleyball team. He played all five matches.

Loor died on 22 March 2011.

His coaches were Ülo Palk, Raimund Pundi, Ivan Dratšov, in Soviet Union team Viacheslav Platonov and Yuri Chesnokov.

Achievements
Olympic winner: 1980
World Champion: 1978, 1982
European Champion: 1975, 1977, 1979, 1981, 1983
World Cup winner: 1977, 1981
European Youth Champion: 1971, 1973
4 × European Club Champions Cup winner 
8 × Soviet Champion

References

External links
Viljar Loor's profile at Sports Reference.com

1953 births
2011 deaths
Sportspeople from Tartu
Estonian men's volleyball players
Soviet men's volleyball players
Olympic volleyball players of the Soviet Union
Volleyball players at the 1980 Summer Olympics
Olympic gold medalists for the Soviet Union
Olympic medalists in volleyball
Medalists at the 1980 Summer Olympics
Honoured Masters of Sport of the USSR